Truth Unveiled by Time is a marble sculpture by Italian artist Gian Lorenzo Bernini. Executed between 1645 and 1652, Bernini intended to show Truth allegorically as a naked young woman being unveiled by a figure of Time above her, but the figure of Time was never executed. Bernini still expressed a wish to add the figure as late as 1665.

Bernini's rationale for creating the work was, according to his son Domenico, as a sculptural retort to attacks from opponents criticising his failed project to build two towers onto the front of St. Peter's Basilica.  Cracks had appeared in the facade due to the inability of the foundations to support the towers and Bernini's architectural expansion received the blame,  although historians are unsure as to the validity of this legend.

Bernini began the preparatory work for Truth Unveiled by Time in 1645, during the critical period after the death of his main patron pope Urban VIII, and the figure of Truth was largely complete by 1652. Despite never completing the figure of Time, Bernini left the sculpture in his will in perpetuity to the first-born of the Bernini family; although in fact Bernini tried to sell the work to Cardinal Mazarin of France. It remained in the family (displayed on a tilted stucco block during the 19th century) until 1924, when it was purchased by the Italian government and transferred to its current home on a plinth in room VI of the Galleria Borghese. Its plinth there was originally tilted but it is now on a flat plinth after a recent restoration, leaving Truth more upright as it was originally displayed.

See also
 Time Unveiling Truth, 1745-1750 painting by Giovanni Battista Tiepolo
 Time Saving Truth from Falsehood and Envy by François Lemoyne
List of works by Gian Lorenzo Bernini

References

Further reading
 
  Copy at Google Books.
 Bernini, Domenico (1713). Vita del Cavalier Gio. Lorenzo Bernino. Rome: Rocco Bernabò. Copy at Google Books.

External links
Galleria Borghese
Galleria Borghese 2
 

1645 sculptures
 
Marble sculptures in Italy
Sculptures by Gian Lorenzo Bernini
Sculptures of women
Sculptures of women in Italy